Adoni revenue division (or Adoni division) is an administrative division in the Kurnool district of the Indian state of Andhra Pradesh. It is one of the 3 revenue divisions in the district with 9 mandals under its administration. The divisional headquarters is located at Adoni.

History 
Adoni revenue division is divided into two parts in April 2022, as new revenue division is formed with Pattikonda as HQ.

Adoni revenue division in old kurnool district

Administration 
The 9 mandals administered under Adoni revenue division are:

See also 
List of revenue divisions in Andhra Pradesh

References 

Revenue divisions in Andhra Pradesh
Kurnool district